Indiana Regional Medical Center is a not-for-profit hospital located in Indiana, Pennsylvania that was founded in 1914. It is one of the eighteen member hospitals of the Pennsylvania Mountains Healthcare Alliance that was established to provide community-based health care via independent community hospitals.

Indiana Regional Medical Center employs more than 50 physicians in and surrounding Indiana, PA. This group of primary care and specialty providers is called IRMC Physician Group.

References

External links
Official Website
Employed Physician Group Website

Hospital buildings completed in 1914
Hospitals in Pennsylvania
Buildings and structures in Indiana County, Pennsylvania